Kulti College is one of the general degree colleges at Kulti in Asansol, Paschim Bardhaman district, West Bengal, India. It offers undergraduate courses in arts, Commerce and sciences. It is affiliated to Kazi Nazrul University, Asansol. It was established in 1986.

Departments

Language
Bengali
English
Sanskrit
Hindi
Urdu

Social Science
Economics
History
Geography
Political Science
Philosophy

Science
Physics
Chemistry
Mathematics
Botany
Zoology
Microbiology

Commerce
Commerce

Accreditation
The college is affiliated to the Kazi Nazrul University, Asansol and recognised by Govt of West Bengal.
The college is accredited by NAAC an autonomous Body of University Grants Commission (UGC).

See also

References

External links
Kulti College (New Site)
Kulti College (Old Site)
Kazi Nazrul University
University Grants Commission
National Assessment and Accreditation Council

Universities and colleges in Paschim Bardhaman district
Colleges affiliated to Kazi Nazrul University
Education in Asansol
Educational institutions established in 1986
1986 establishments in West Bengal
Academic institutions formerly affiliated with the University of Burdwan